Barracking may refer to:
 Crowd abuse - the meaning of "barracking" in most of the world 
 Cheering - the predominant meaning of "barracking" in Australia and New Zealand